Weetman Harold Miller Pearson, 2nd Viscount Cowdray,  (18 April 1882 – 5 October 1933), styled The Honourable Harold Pearson between 1910 and 1927, was a British peer and Liberal Party politician.

Background
Cowdray was the son of Weetman Dickinson Pearson, 1st Viscount Cowdray, and his wife Annie, daughter of Sir John Cass.

Political career
Cowdray was elected as Member of Parliament for Eye at a by-election April 1906, and held the seat until the 1918 general election, which he did not contest. In 1927 he succeeded his father in the viscountcy and entered the House of Lords. He was also a major in the Sussex Yeomanry and a Deputy Lieutenant of Sussex. He was the Chairman of the Hurlingham Club Polo Committee until his death.

Polo
He learnt to play polo at Oxford University and his love of the sport resulted in the grounds being laid out at Cowdray House in 1910.  Chukkas started in April, although most competitions coincided with the festival of racing at nearby Goodwood in late July - the principal cup being the Cowdray Park Challenge Cup, still played for today. When Harold acquired the estate in 1919, he renamed his 'Capron House' team (named after his former residence) to 'Cowdray Park' accordingly. The yellow of their team shirts was their signature colour to match the Liberal Party, which he and his father supported.

Family

Lord Cowdray married Agnes Beryl, daughter of Lord Edward Spencer-Churchill, in 1905. They had one son and five daughters. He died in October 1933, aged 51, and was succeeded by his only son, Weetman. Lady Cowdray died in February 1948, aged 66.

References

External links
 

1882 births
1933 deaths
2nd
Deputy Lieutenants of Sussex
Harold
Sussex Yeomanry officers
Pearson, Harold
Pearson, Harold
Pearson, Harold
Pearson, Harold
UK MPs who inherited peerages